The Stephen Winsor House is a historic house in Smithfield, Rhode Island, United States.  The -story wood-frame house was built c. 1850–55 by Stephen Winsor, whose family had long lived in the Smithfield area and owned extensive lands there.  The house is a high-quality and well-preserved example of Italianate styling, with corner pilasters, deep bracketed eaves, and pointed-arch windows in the gables.  The house remained in the Winsor family until c. 1970; it is set on a handsomely landscaped property (apparently also a long-standing feature), down a winding driveway on the north side of Austin Avenue.

The property was listed on the National Register of Historic Places in 1975.

See also
National Register of Historic Places listings in Providence County, Rhode Island

References

Houses completed in 1850
Houses on the National Register of Historic Places in Rhode Island
Houses in Providence County, Rhode Island
Buildings and structures in Smithfield, Rhode Island
National Register of Historic Places in Providence County, Rhode Island